The antidepressant drug doxepin has been associated with a number of different adverse effects, including the following.

The incidence of these adverse effects is not totally known as the scarcity of well-designed clinical trials involving doxepin prohibits it. Side effects that are common (based on its pharmacology or the frequency of these side effects with related agents) appear with a * superscript whereas the side effects which are serious are in bold. Doxepin is licensed to be used in much smaller doses (viz., 3mg and 6 mg) in some countries, the side-effects profile of which may differ from this list.

 Nausea*
 Dizziness*
 Drowsiness*
 Dry mouth*
 Constipation*
 Blurred vision*
 Headache*
 Urinary hesitancy*
 Agitation*
 Hypotension (low blood pressure)
 Hypertension (high blood pressure)
 Tachycardia (high heart rate)
 Skin rash
 Facial oedema
 Photosensitisation
 Urticaria (hives)
 Pruritus (itching)
 Indigestion
 Bone fractures
 Taste disturbances
 Diarrhoea
 Anorexia (weight loss)
 Aphthous stomatitis (canker sores)
 Gynaecomastia (swelling of the breasts in men)
 Galactorrhoea (lactation that is unassociated with breast feeding or pregnancy)
 Chills
 Fatigue
 Weakness
 Flushing
 Alopecia (hair loss)
 Eosinohpilia
 Blood dyscrasias (abnormalities in the cellular composition of blood)
 Increased liver function tests
 Hyperpyrexia (high fever ≥41.5 °C or 106.7 °F)
 Seizures
 Confusion
 Malaise
 Increased appetite*
 Changes in ECG parameters (e.g. QRS & PR interval)
 Ataxia
 Hallucinations
 Paraesthesias
 Nervousness
 Numbness
 Tinnitus
 Hepatitis (liver swelling)
 Exacerbation of asthma
 Hepatic (liver) abnormalities
 Urinary retention
 Extrapyramidal symptoms
 Testicular swelling
 Hyperglycaemia (high blood sugar)
 Hypoglycaemia (low blood sugar)
 Hyponatraemia (low blood sodium)
 Syndrome of inappropriate secretion of antidiuretic hormone (SIADH)
 Closed-angle glaucoma
 Alzheimer's disease or dementia*

References

Doxepin